John A. "Cub" Stricker, born John A. Streaker (June 8, 1859 – November 19, 1937) was an American professional baseball second baseman. He played in Major League Baseball (MLB) for seven different teams during his 11-season career, mostly with the Philadelphia Athletics and Cleveland Blues/Spiders.

Career
He stole 60 bases the following year, and finished his career with a respectable 278, along with 1,106 base hits and a .239 batting average.

In , he was signed by the St. Louis Browns to be the team's player-manager. His time was cut short when after 23 games, the team had only won six of them. The final straw came after a home loss, and Stricker jumped into the stands and punched a fan who had been heckling the team. He was traded soon after to the Pittsburgh Pirates in exchange for Pud Galvin. Cub did not play a game for the Pirates, as he was traded again, three days later to the Baltimore Orioles in exchange for Adonis Terry.

Though his career was unremarkable, it was marred by an incident in his final season, while playing with the Washington Senators. During the sixth inning of a game on August 5, 1893 in Philadelphia, the crowd was jeering the Senators relentlessly when, after making the third out, Stricker walked over near the crowd and feigned throwing the ball at them a couple times until he finally did release the ball. The ball struck the ground before the fence that divided the crowd and the baseball field and bounded over the fence and struck a young man in the face, breaking his nose. Stricker was arrested, and held until a hearing could be conducted. He apologized, explaining that he meant to only throw it into the fence and that it was an accident.

Post-career
Stricker died at the age of 78 in his hometown of Philadelphia and was interred at West Laurel Hill Cemetery in Bala Cynwyd, Pennsylvania.

See also
List of Major League Baseball career stolen bases leaders
List of Major League Baseball player-managers

References

External links

 Cub Stricker at SABR (Baseball BioProject)

1859 births
1937 deaths
19th-century baseball players
Atlanta Atlantas players
Baltimore Orioles (NL) players
Major League Baseball player-managers
Baseball players from Philadelphia
Boston Reds (PL) players
Chester (minor league baseball) players
Cleveland Blues (1887–88) players
Cleveland Infants players
Cleveland Spiders players
Major League Baseball second basemen
Philadelphia Athletics (AA) players
Philadelphia Athletics (minor league) players
Pottsville (minor league baseball) players
Providence Clamdiggers (baseball) players
Providence Grays (minor league) players
Scranton Indians players
Springfield Ponies players
St. Louis Browns managers
St. Louis Browns (AA) players
Washington Senators (1891–1899) players